"Robins and Roses" is a 1936 song with music by Joe Burke, and lyrics by Edgar Leslie.

Selected recordings
1936 Bing Crosby recorded March 29, 1936 with Victor Young and his Orchestra. Crosby's recording was very popular and reached No. 2 in the charts of the day.
1936 Orville Knapp - his Brunswick recording charted briefly just before Knapp's death in a plane crash.
1936 Jimmy Dorsey and his Orchestra - recorded March 28, 1936, vocal by Kay Weber, for Decca Records (catalog 776A).
1936 Tommy Dorsey and his Orchestra - recorded March 25, 1936 for Victor Records (catalog No. 25284), vocal by Edythe Wright.
1958 Pat Boone on his album Yes Indeed!
1958 Jeri Southern for her album Jeri Southern Meets Johnny Smith.

References

1936 songs
Songs with music by Joe Burke (composer)
Songs written by Edgar Leslie